Portugal competed at the 2022 Mediterranean Games held in Oran, Algeria from 25 June to 6 July 2022.

Medalists

| width="78%" align="left" valign="top" |

Archery

Portugal competed in archery.

Athletics

Portugal won eight medals in athletics.

Artistic gymnastics

Portugal won one bronze medal in artistic gymnastics.

Cycling

Portugal won two medals in cycling.

Judo

Portugal competed in judo.

Karate

Portugal competed in karate.

Men

Women

Shooting

Portugal won one medal in shooting.

Swimming

Portugal won nine medals in swimming.

Table tennis

Portugal won four medals in table tennis.

Tennis

Portugal competed in tennis.

Water polo

Summary

Group play

Wrestling

Portugal competed in wrestling.

References

Nations at the 2022 Mediterranean Games
2022
Mediterranean Games